Stéphane Abaul (born 23 November 1991 in Martinique) is a professional footballer who plays as a midfielder for Club Franciscain in the Martinique Championnat National and internationally for Martinique.

He made his debut for Martinique in 2010. He was in the Martinique Gold Cup squads for the 2013 and 2017  tournaments.

Career statistics
Scores and results list Martinique's goal tally first, score column indicates score after each Abaul goal.

References

1991 births
Living people
Martiniquais footballers
Martinique international footballers
Association football midfielders
Club Franciscain players
People from Le Lamentin
2013 CONCACAF Gold Cup players
2017 CONCACAF Gold Cup players
2019 CONCACAF Gold Cup players
2021 CONCACAF Gold Cup players